The Clywedog Reservoir is a reservoir near Llanidloes, Wales on the head-waters of the River Severn. The construction of the reservoir was enabled by an Act of Parliament which asserted that "At certain times the flow of water in the river is inadequate ... unless that flow were regulated so as to ensure that at those times water in addition to the natural flow will flow down the river."

Purpose
Its primary purpose was to regulate the flow in the River Severn to mitigate flooding and provide support for drinking water abstractions for the West Midlands. It was completed in 1967 and is situated near the B4518 road north of Llanidloes, Powys.

It regulates the flow of water in the River Severn by releasing water into the river channel during low flow periods and re-filling during the wetter winter months. Capacity is held in the reservoir throughout the winter so that it retains capacity to mitigate downstream flooding by absorbing excess flow from the head-waters of the Afon Clywedog, a tributary of the River Severn. The reservoir was formed by damming both the Afon Clywedog and a much smaller embankment dam located at Bwlch-y-gle to prevent overflow into the next valley. When at capacity the reservoir contains approximately 50,000 megalitres of water.

Construction
Construction of the dam started in 1963 after the passing of an Act of Parliament ordering its creation to help prevent flooding of the River Severn in winter and to maintain its water levels in the summer. On top of several disruptions and protests, during construction in 1966 a bomb was detonated within the construction site, setting work back by almost two months. The political extremist group Mudiad Amddiffyn Cymru (MAC) was widely suspected of carrying out the bombing.

Operation
The reservoir was opened in 1967 and has been in continuous usage since then, generally filling with water over the winter months and gradually releasing it during the summer months. The reservoir is currently owned and operated by Severn Trent Water Limited with oversight and regulation by Natural Resources Wales. Clywedog Sailing Club operates on the lake, and Powys County Council's Staylittle Outdoor Centre delivers a range of adventure education both on the water and in the surrounding area.

The dam operating plant runs self-sufficiently from a 500 kW hydro-electric turbine. The area around Clywedog dam is now a popular leisure destination offering scenic walks and wildlife watching. At the base of the dam lies the ruins of the Bryntail lead mine. In 2005 Natural Resources Wales installed an osprey nest platform near the reservoir. The nest has been in use by breeding ospreys since 2014; by the end of 2019, 15 osprey chicks had been raised on the site. A web camera was installed in 2020 enabling video of the nest to be viewed online. A trout fishery operates on the reservoir.

References

External links

 Llyn Clywedog – Llanidloes website
 Welcome to Lyn Clywedog Reservoir – BirminghamUK archives
 Llyn Clywedog Trout Fishery - Llyn Clywedog Trout Fishery website

Reservoirs in Powys
Dams in Wales
Dams in Powys
Buttress dams
Elenydd
River regulation in Powys
RClywedog